This is a list of notable Russian restaurants. Russian cuisine is a collection of the different cooking traditions of the Russian people. Russian cuisine derives its varied character from the vast and multi-cultural expanse of Russia. Moreover, it is necessary to divide Russian traditional cuisine and Soviet cuisine, which has its own peculiarity. Its foundations were laid by the peasant food of the rural population in an often harsh climate, with a combination of plentiful fish, poultry, game, mushrooms, berries, and honey. Crops of rye, wheat, barley and millet provided the ingredients for a plethora of breads, pancakes, cereals, beer and vodka.  Soups and stews full of flavor are centered on seasonal or storable produce, fish and meats.

Russian restaurants

 
 
 , Portland, Oregon

See also

 Lists of restaurants
 List of Russian dishes
 Restaurants in Russia (category)

References

 
Russian